Ludovic Pollet (born 18 June 1970) is a French former footballer who played as a defender. He worked most recently as a coach at AS Cannes.

Playing career
Born in Vieux-Condé, Pollet began his career as a trainee at AS Cannes, breaking into the first team in 1991. He made nine appearances in his debut season as the club were relegated from Ligue 1. He made sporadic appearances over the next two seasons as the club regained its top flight status. Pollet really established himself during the 1994–95 season, where he also scored his first professional goal.

He was signed by Ligue 2 side Le Havre in Summer 1995 and he became a first choice player as the club won promotion. He played three seasons in France's top division with the club before being loaned out to English First Division side Wolverhampton Wanderers in September 1999.

Pollet made his Wolves debut on 11 September 1999 in a 0–1 defeat to Huddersfield Town. After impressing over six loan games, he was signed permanently for £350,000 in October 1999. He became a first choice player in Colin Lee's side and his performances saw him become a fan favourite as he was voted Player of the Season.

He remained a first choice player during the 2000–01 campaign, but the following summer saw new manager Dave Jones reshape the squad, relegating Pollet to the substitutes bench. He managed only ten further league outings for the club over the next two seasons, although gaining some playing time on loan at lower league Walsall. He was eventually released by Wolves in June 2003, days after they gained promotion to the Premier League.

Pollet then returned to his native France with USL Dunkerque where he played three further season before retiring and becoming an assistant coach for the club.

External links
 
 

1970 births
Living people
Association football defenders
French football managers
French footballers
Ligue 1 players
Ligue 2 players
English Football League players
AS Cannes players
Le Havre AC players
USL Dunkerque players
Wolverhampton Wanderers F.C. players
Walsall F.C. players
AS Cannes managers
USL Dunkerque managers